White Oaks Secondary School (WOSS) is a secondary school located in Oakville, Ontario, Canada.

The school has north and south campuses, across the road from each other. The north campus used to be attended by students who had different levels and types of capabilities than those of the south campus.  The school now acts as a whole, and students can take classes at North or South campus. The north campus offers hands-on technical programs such as hairdressing, child care, autobody and carpentry, as well as classes for students with a wide range of disabilities, and English Language Learner programs (ELL), and is the location for recognized Ontario Youth Apprenticeship Programs (OYAP) and the Ford Academy of Manufacturing Sciences (FAMS).  White Oaks also offers French at the immersion level, as well as the International Baccalaureate Diploma programme. In the Fraser Institute's report on Ontario schools for the 2012-2013 year, the school was ranked 39 out of 740 secondary schools with an overall rating of 8.3/10.

Notable alumni
Chris Hadfield, the first Canadian to walk in space, spent four years at White Oaks Secondary School before attending Milton District High School for his OAC.
 Mike Vanderjagt, ex-NFL kicker, graduated from White Oaks Secondary School.
 Shane Told, the lead singer of the Post-Hardcore band Silverstein.
 Glenn Milchem, drummer for popular Canadian band Blue Rodeo.
Tony Mandarich, NFL Green Bay Packers #1 Draft Pick graduated from White Oaks Secondary School
 Geri Hall, actress on Canadian comedy show "This Hour has 22 Minutes", popular TV commercial actor.
 Arda Ocal, Host of "Right After Wrestling" on The Score Television Network.
 Diana Matheson, midfielder for Canada's women's soccer team.
 Mark McEwan Chef, Entrepreneur, host of Top Chef Canada
 Rob Zamuner, former NHL hockey player
 Dan Lett, actor
 Scott Wilson (ice hockey), former NHL hockey 
 Madeline Schizas, Canadian Olympic figure skater

See also
List of high schools in Ontario

References

External links
 

High schools in Oakville, Ontario
International Baccalaureate schools in Ontario
1965 establishments in Ontario
Educational institutions established in 1965